Imago-ike Dam is an earthfill dam, used for irrigation, located in Shiga prefecture in Japan. The catchment area of the dam is 0.9 km2. The dam impounds about 1  ha of land when full and can store 110 thousand cubic meters of water.

References

Dams in Shiga Prefecture
1964 establishments in Japan